Live on Tour is a live album by American singer-songwriter John Prine, released in 1997. The album also include three studio tracks.

Reception

Writing for Allmusic, critic Jeff Burger wrote of the album "The studio tracks tacked onto the end of this album are nothing to write home about, but overall, Live on Tour is a solid collection. Featuring everything from tender folk ballads to rockers packed with Prine's trademark wacky witticisms, it would be a perfect starting point for anyone who has had the misfortune to have not yet encountered this one-of-a-kind artist."

Track listing
All tracks composed by John Prine; except where indicated
"Picture Show" – 3:54
"Quit Hollerin' at Me" (Prine, Gary Nicholson) – 6:10
 "You Got Gold" (Prine, Keith Sykes) – 4:55
"Unwed Fathers" (Braddock, Prine) – 3:00
"Space Monkey" (Prine, Peter Case) – 5:12
"The Late John Garfield Blues" – 4:11
"Storm Windows" – 4:32
 "Jesus the Missing Years" – 6:38
"Humidity Built the Snowman" – 4:51
"Illegal Smile" – 4:33
 "Daddy's Little Pumpkin" (Prine, Pat McLaughlin) – 3:38
"Lake Marie" – 8:47
"If I Could" (Tim Carroll) – 3:10
"Stick a Needle in My Eye" (Pat McLaughlin, Prine) – 3:06
"You Mean So Much to Me" (Prine, Donnie Fritts) – 4:14

Personnel
John Prine – vocals, guitar
Larry Crane – guitar, backing vocals
Howie Epstein – bass
Jack Holder – guitar
David Jacques – bass
John Jorgenson – guitar, banjo, mandolin
Pat McLaughlin – guitar
Phil Parlapiano – organ, piano, accordion, backing vocals
Joe Romersa – drums, percussion
Sam Shoup – bass
David Steele – guitar, backing vocals
Benmont Tench – piano, keyboards
Robby Turner – pedal steel guitar
Jason Wilber – guitar, backing vocals
Gary Belz – backing vocals
Al Bunetta – backing vocals
Keith Sykes – backing vocals

References

John Prine albums
1997 live albums
Oh Boy Records albums